James Arthur Bacon (fourth ¼ 1896 – fourth ¼ 1968) was a Welsh rugby union, and professional rugby league footballer who played in the 1910s, 1920s and 1930s, and coached rugby league in the 1920s.

Background
Jim Bacon's birth was registered in Newport, Wales, and his death aged 72 was registered in Weston-super-Mare, Somerset.

Playing career
Jim Bacon played rugby union for Cross Keys RFC, and having appeared as a trialist for Wales (RU) some weeks before, he moved north and made his professional début for English rugby league club Leeds against Bradford Northern at Headingley Rugby Stadium, Leeds on Saturday 14 December 1918. Bacon was selected to go on the 1920 Great Britain Lions tour of Australasia. He won caps for Great Britain (RL) while at Leeds in 1920 against Australia (3 matches), and New Zealand (3 matches), in 1921 against Australia (2 matches), in 1922 against Australia, in 1924 against Australia, and in 1927 against New Zealand. From 1921 until 1927 he also represented Wales, winning six caps, all against England, including 1-victory, and 5-defeats.

Jim Bacon played , i.e. number 5, in Monmouthshire's 14-18 defeat by Glamorgan in the non-County Championship match during the 1926–27 season at Taff Vale Park, Pontypridd on Saturday 30 April 1927.

Jim Bacon played left-, i.e. number 4, and scored 2-tries in Leeds' 11–3 victory over Dewsbury in the 1921–22 Yorkshire County Cup Final during the 1921–22 season at Thrum Hall, Halifax on Saturday 26 November 1921. Bacon played left-, i.e. number 4 and was captain in Leeds' 28–3 victory over Hull F.C. in the 1922–23 Challenge Cup Final during the 1922–23 season at Belle Vue, Wakefield, the only occasion the Challenge Cup Final has ever been staged at Belle Vue. The Leeds backline in the early 1920s was known as the Busy Bs, as it included; Jim Bacon, Arthur Binks, Billy Bowen, Joe Brittain and Harold Buck.

Coaching career
Bacon coached Castleford in the 1928–29 season from Saturday 25 August 1928 to Saturday 27 April 1929, Castleford finished 21st out of 28 clubs in the Championship, and reached the semi-final of the 1928–29 Challenge Cup, losing 3-9 to the eventual runner-up Dewsbury on Saturday 6 April 1929.

Genealogical information
Bacon's marriage to Vera (née Tatterson) was registered during second ¼ 1927 in Bramley district. They had children; Courtney J. Bacon , and Glenys O. Bacon .

References

External links
!Great Britain Statistics at englandrl.co.uk (statistics currently missing due to not having appeared for both Great Britain, and England)

1896 births
1968 deaths
Castleford Tigers coaches
Castleford Tigers players
Cross Keys RFC players
Footballers who switched code
Great Britain national rugby league team players
Leeds Rhinos captains
Leeds Rhinos players
Monmouthshire rugby league team players
Rugby league centres
Rugby league players from Newport, Wales
Rugby league wingers
Rugby union players from Newport, Wales
Wales national rugby league team players
Welsh rugby league coaches
Welsh rugby league players
Welsh rugby union players